The Bishop of Waterford was a medieval prelate, governing the Diocese of Waterford from its creation in the 11th century until it was absorbed into the new Roman Catholic Diocese of Waterford and Lismore in the 14th century. After the creation of four archdioceses for Ireland in the middle of the 12th century, Waterford fell under the Archbishop of Cashel.

The beginnings of the bishopric of Waterford can be dated fairly securely. The Norse city of Waterford became a bishopric in 1096, when Anselm, Archbishop of Canterbury consecrated Malchus (Máel Ísu Ua hAinmere) as its first bishop. Pope John XXII had decreed on 31 June 1327 that the bishoprics of Waterford and Lismore were to be united upon the death of either living bishop, Nicholas Welifed of Waterford (died 1337) and John Leynagh of Lismore (died 1354). This did not occur until 1363 however, when Thomas le Reve, Leynagh's successor at Lismore, took over the temporalities of the bishopric of Waterford.

List of bishops

See also
 Diocese of Waterford
 Waterford Cathedral

References

Lists of Irish bishops and archbishops
Religion in County Waterford
Bishops of Waterford
Former Roman Catholic bishoprics in Ireland